The 2011 Great Alaska Shootout, was the 33rd Great Alaska Shootout competition, the annual college basketball tournament in Anchorage, Alaska that features colleges from all over the United States. The 2011 event was held from November 23, 2011, through November 26, 2011, with 8 colleges attending from Kentucky, Alaska, New Hampshire, California, Michigan, New Mexico, and Mississippi.

Brackets 
* – Denotes overtime period

Men's

Women's

References

Great Alaska Shootout
Great Alaska Shootout
Great Alaska Shootout

2011 in sports in Alaska
November 2011 sports events in the United States